1997 - 2007 is the first greatest hits album from Japanese electronica/rock duo Boom Boom Satellites released on January 27, 2010. The two-disc album compiles the first 10 years of their music with tracks released between 1997 and 2007. A limited edition DVD version was also released containing recordings of live performances and music videos. An alternate best of was released for the American market titled Over and Over to coincide with a series of tourdates in United States. It is a single-disc retooling of 19972007 with a truncated track list.

19972007 ultimately reached number 8 on the Oricon's Weekly Album Charts.

Track list

References

External links
 Boom Boom Satellites official website

Boom Boom Satellites compilation albums
2010 greatest hits albums
2010 live albums
2010 video albums
Sony Music Entertainment Japan albums
Live video albums
Music video compilation albums
Boom Boom Satellites video albums
Boom Boom Satellites live albums
Japanese-language live albums
Japanese-language compilation albums
Japanese-language video albums